Between 2002 and 2004, Ariel Castro kidnapped Michelle Knight, Amanda Berry, and Georgina "Gina" DeJesus from the streets of Cleveland, Ohio and later held them captive in his home of 2207 Seymour Avenue in the city's Tremont neighborhood. All three girls were imprisoned at Castro's home until 2013, when Berry successfully escaped with her six-year-old daughter, to whom she had given birth while imprisoned, and contacted the police. Police rescued Knight and DeJesus, and arrested Castro hours later. 

Castro was charged with four counts of kidnapping and three counts of rape. He pleaded guilty to 937 criminal counts of rape, kidnapping and aggravated murder as part of a plea bargain. He was sentenced to life imprisonment plus 1,000 years in prison without the possibility of parole. One month into his life sentence, Castro died by suicide by hanging himself with bed sheets in his prison cell.

Kidnapper background
Ariel Castro was born in Duey, Yauco, Puerto Rico, the son of Pedro Castro and Lillian Rodriguez. His parents divorced when he was a child, and he moved to the mainland United States with his mother and three biological siblings. They first lived in Reading, Pennsylvania, before settling in Cleveland, Ohio, where Castro's father and several other family members were living. Castro had nine siblings (both biological and half) and graduated from Cleveland's Lincoln-West High School in 1979.

Castro met his girlfriend, Grimilda Figueroa, when his family moved into a house across the street from hers in the 1980s. Castro and Figueroa lived with both sets of their parents until they moved into their own home at 2207 Seymour Avenue, located in Cleveland's Tremont neighborhood, in 1992. Their home was a two-story, four-bedroom, one-bathroom house with an  unfinished basement built in 1890 and remodeled in 1956.

According to Figueroa's sister, Elida Caraballo, she said that "all hell started breaking loose" when the couple moved into their new home. Caraballo claimed that Castro beat Figueroa, breaking her nose, ribs, and arms and causing a blood clot on her brain that resulted in an inoperable tumor. He also threw her down a flight of stairs, cracking her skull. In 1993, Castro was arrested for domestic violence, but was not indicted by a grand jury.

In 1996, Figueroa moved out of the house and secured custody of her four children. Police assisted in the move and detained Castro, but they did not press charges. Castro continued to threaten and attack Figueroa after she left him, according to Caraballo. Figueroa filed charges in 2005 in Cuyahoga County Domestic Relations Court, accusing Castro of inflicting multiple severe injuries on her and of "frequently" abducting their daughters. The court granted her a temporary restraining order against Castro, but it was dismissed a few months later. Figueroa died in 2012 due to complications from her brain tumor. Friends and relatives gathered on Denison Avenue on April 29, 2012, for memorial services in her honor.

Before his arrest at age 52, Castro worked as a bus driver for the Cleveland Metropolitan School District until he was fired in November 2012 for "bad judgment", including making an illegal U-turn with children on his bus, using his bus to go grocery shopping, leaving a child on the bus while he went for lunch, and leaving the bus unattended while he took a nap at home. He was earning $18.91 per hour when he was discharged. At the time of his arrest, Castro's home was in foreclosure after three years of unpaid real estate taxes.

Kidnappings

Castro kidnapped his victims by offering them a ride; he drove each to his home at 2207 Seymour Avenue, lured them inside, took them to the basement, and restrained them.

Michelle Knight
Michelle Knight (born April 23, 1981) disappeared on August 23, 2002, after leaving a cousin's house. She was 21 years old at the time. On the day of her disappearance, she was scheduled to appear in court for a child custody case involving her son Joey, who was in the custody of the state.

Following Knight's rescue, police acknowledged that limited resources had been spent on investigating her disappearance, in part because she was an adult. Authorities believed that she had run away voluntarily due to anger over losing custody of her son. According to Cleveland Deputy Police Chief Ed Tomba, she was "the focus of very few tips". Some criticized her subsequent removal from the National Crime Information Center database fifteen months after she disappeared, which made her largely unknown prior to her rescue. The Cleveland Division of Police (CDP) and the Federal Bureau of Investigation (FBI) maintain that her inclusion or exclusion had no bearing on her rescue.

Amanda Berry
Amanda Marie Berry (born April 22, 1986) disappeared on April 21, 2003, the day before her 17th birthday. She was last heard from around 8:00p.m. when she called her sister to tell her that she was getting a ride home from her job at a Burger King at West 110th Street and Lorain Avenue. The FBI initially considered her a runaway until a week after her disappearance, when an unidentified male used her cell phone to call her mother. He said: "I have Amanda. She's fine and will be coming home in a couple of days".

Berry was featured in a 2004 segment of Fox's America's Most Wanted (re-aired in 2005 and 2006), which linked her to Gina DeJesus, who by that point had also gone missing in Cleveland. Berry and DeJesus were profiled on The Oprah Winfrey Show and The Montel Williams Show, where self-proclaimed psychic Sylvia Browne told Berry's mother Louwana Miller in November 2004 that her daughter was dead and that she was "in water". This pronouncement devastated her mother, causing her to take down pictures and give away Berry's computer. However, Miller continued to search for Berry before dying from heart failure in early March 2006. Later that year, on December 25, 2006, Berry gave birth to a daughter. DNA evidence has confirmed that Castro was the father of the child.

Robert Wolford was a prison inmate who had lived in Tremont, and he claimed in July 2012 that he had information about the location of Berry's body. He led police to an empty lot on Cleveland's West Side, where they conducted a fruitless search. He was sentenced in January 2013 to  years in prison for obstruction of justice, making a false report, and making a false alarm.

Gina DeJesus

Georgina "Gina" Lynn DeJesus (born February 13, 1990) went missing on April 2, 2004, at age 14. She was last seen at a payphone around 3:00p.m. while on the way home from her middle school at West 105th Street and Lorain Avenue. At the time, she was friends with Castro's daughter Arlene. Shortly before Gina disappeared, she and Arlene had called Arlene's mother, Grimilda Figueroa, for permission to have a sleepover at DeJesus's house, but Figueroa replied that they could not and the two girls parted ways. Arlene was the last person to see DeJesus before her disappearance.

DeJesus was under the impression that Castro was picking her up to drop her off at home, and she trusted Castro because she was friends with his teenage daughter. No one witnessed her abduction and an AMBER Alert was not issued, which angered her father. He said in 2006, "The Amber Alert should work for any missing child. ... Whether it's an abduction or a runaway, a child needs to be found. We need to change this law".

A year after DeJesus's disappearance, the FBI released a composite sketch and description of a male suspect, described as, "Latino, 25 to 35 years of age, with green eyes, a goatee, and possibly a pencil-thin beard".

DeJesus was featured in the America's Most Wanted segment which linked her to Berry. The disappearances received regular media attention into 2012, while the families held public vigils. Castro attended at least two of these vigils, reportedly participated in a search party, and tried to get close to the DeJesus family. Castro's son Anthony was a journalism student in 2004, and he interviewed DeJesus's mother for an article about the disappearances in the Plain Press newspaper. Police kept the investigation open and offered a $25,000 reward for information.

According to Castro's uncle, his family knew the DeJesus family and had lived in the same neighborhood. Castro falsely claimed that he was not aware that DeJesus was a member of that family when he abducted her.

Captivity
Upon being kidnapped, Castro took Michelle Knight to the upper floor of his house, tied her hands and feet together, and pulled her up using her hands, feet, and neck. He left her there for three days without food. Prosecutors at Castro's sentencing wrote that diaries kept by his victims "speak of forced sexual conduct, of being locked in a dark room, of anticipating the next session of abuse, of the dreams of someday escaping and being reunited with family, of being chained to a wall, of being held like a prisoner of war, of missing the lives they once enjoyed, of emotional abuse, of his threats to kill, of being treated like an animal, of continuous abuse, and of desiring freedom". The women were kept in locked bedrooms, where they were forced to use plastic toilets that were "emptied infrequently". They were fed one meal a day and allowed to shower twice a week at most.

Knight told police that Castro had impregnated her at least five times and had induced miscarriages each time through beatings, hitting her with dumbbells, punching her, and slamming her against walls. He also starved her. Knight's grandmother told reporters that she would require facial reconstruction surgery due to the beatings that she endured, and had lost hearing in one ear. At one point, Knight had a pet dog while in captivity, but Castro killed it by snapping its neck after it bit him while trying to protect Knight. DeJesus told law enforcement that she was raped, but did not believe that she was ever impregnated.

On Christmas Day 2006, Castro allegedly ordered Knight to assist in the birth of Berry's child, which took place in a small inflatable swimming pool, and threatened to kill her if the baby did not survive. At one point, the baby stopped breathing, but Knight was able to resuscitate her. Castro occasionally took Berry's daughter out of the house, including to visit his mother; she called him "daddy" and Castro's mother "grandmother". In 2013, he showed one of his adult daughters a picture of the child and said that she was his girlfriend's daughter from a previous relationship; he had told others that she was his granddaughter. Berry taught her daughter how to read and write.

According to a statement from the CDP, officers visited Castro's home only once following the kidnappings to discuss an unrelated incident. Castro did not appear to be home at the time and was later interviewed elsewhere. Neighbors claimed to have called the police about suspicious activity observed at the home, but police have said that they have no record of any such calls. Castro's son Anthony reported that there were certain areas of the house that were locked and inaccessible. He also mentioned an occasion three weeks before the women's escape when Castro asked him if Berry would ever be found. Anthony said that he told Castro that Berry was likely dead, to which Castro responded: "Really? You think so?"

NBC affiliate WKYC reported that Castro recalled each of the three abductions in great detail during his interrogation and indicated that they were unplanned crimes of opportunity. According to WKYC's sources, Castro did not have an "exit plan" and believed that he would eventually be caught. He referred to himself as "coldblooded" and a sex addict. Police found a suicide note in the house in which he discussed the abductions and wrote that his money and possessions should be given to the kidnapped women if he were caught.

Escape and rescue
On May 6, 2013, Berry was finally able to make contact with Castro's neighbors, leading to her escape with her 6-year-old daughter and the rescue of DeJesus and Knight by authorities. According to police, Castro had left the house that day and Berry realized that he had failed to lock the "big inside door", although the exterior storm door was bolted. She did not attempt to break through the outer door because she thought that Castro "was testing her", according to the police report. Previously, Castro had tested the women by leaving the house partially unlocked and exits unsecured. If they attempted to escape, he beat them. Instead, Berry screamed for help when she saw neighbors through the screen.

Neighbor Angel Cordero responded to the screaming, but was unable to communicate with Berry because he spoke little English. Neighbor Charles Ramsey joined Cordero at the house's front door during the rescue. They kicked a hole through the bottom of the storm door and Berry crawled through, carrying her daughter. Ramsey said that Berry told him that she and her child were being kept inside the house against her will. Upon being freed, she went to the house of another Spanish-speaking neighbor and, with Ramsey's assistance, called 9-1-1, saying: "Help me, I've been kidnapped, and I've been missing for ten years. And I'm here. I'm free now!"

Responding police officers Anthony Espada, Michael Tracy and Barbara Johnson entered Castro's house. They walked through an upstairs hallway with guns drawn, announcing themselves as CDP. After peeking out from a slightly opened bedroom door, Knight entered the hallway and leaped into an officer's arms, repeatedly saying, "You saved me." Soon afterward, DeJesus entered the hallway from another room. Knight and DeJesus walked out of the house, and all three women, plus the child, were taken to MetroHealth Medical Center. Berry and DeJesus were released from the hospital the next day, and Knight was discharged four days later on May 10.

Arrest and legal proceedings

Castro was arrested on May 6, 2013. He was charged with four counts of kidnapping and three counts of rape on May 8, which carry prison sentences of ten years to life in Ohio. Two of Castro's brothers, Pedro and Onil, were also initially taken into custody, but were released on May 9 after police announced that they had no involvement in the kidnappings. The charges against the two brothers were dropped.

Castro made his first court appearance at the Cleveland Municipal Court on May 9, where bail was set at $2 million per kidnapping charge, adding to a total of $8 million. Prosecutors intended to seek the death penalty against Castro. Additional charges were reported to be pending, including aggravated murder (for intentional induction of miscarriages), attempted murder, assault, a charge for each instance of rape, and a kidnapping charge for each day each captive was held. On May 14, Castro's attorneys said he would plead "not guilty" to all charges if indicted for kidnapping and rape.

A Cuyahoga County grand jury returned a true bill of indictment against Castro on June 7. It contained 329 counts, including two counts of aggravated murder (under different sections of the Ohio criminal code) for his role in the termination of one of the women's pregnancies. The indictments covered only the period from August 2002 to February 2007. The county prosecutor, Timothy J. McGinty, stated that the investigation was ongoing, and that any further findings would be presented to the grand jury. McGinty said that pursuing a death penalty specification would be considered following completion of indictment proceedings.

After entering a not guilty plea for Castro on June 12, one of his attorneys, Craig Weintraub, said that although some of the charges against Castro were indisputable, "it is our hope that we can continue to work toward a resolution to avoid having an unnecessary trial about aggravated murder and the death penalty". He noted, "We are very sensitive to the emotional strain and impact that a trial would have on the women, their families and this community". Castro was found competent to stand trial on July 3.

On July 12, a Cuyahoga County grand jury returned a true bill of indictment for the remainder of the period after February 2007. It brought the total to 977 counts: 512 counts of kidnapping, 446 of rape, seven of gross sexual imposition, six of felonious assault, three of child endangerment, two of aggravated murder, and one of possession of criminal tools. On July 17, Castro pleaded not guilty to the expanded indictment. He faced death by lethal injection if convicted on all of the charges.

Castro pleaded guilty on July 26 to 937 of the 977 charges against him, including charges of kidnapping, rape, and aggravated murder, as part of a plea bargain which called for consecutive sentences of life in prison plus 1,000 years, all without parole. Under the plea deal, Castro forfeited his right to appeal, and could not profit in any way due to his crimes. He also forfeited his assets, including his Seymour Avenue house, which prosecutors said would be demolished. Castro was told by Cuyahoga County Common Pleas Court Judge Michael Russo, "You will not be getting out. Is that clear?" to which Castro responded, "I do understand that, your honor." Castro also made comments about his "addiction to pornography" and "sexual problem", but was cut off by Judge Russo, who said such issues could be discussed at the August 1 sentencing hearing. A law firm representing Berry, DeJesus, and Knight released a statement that the three women were "relieved by today's plea. They are satisfied by this resolution to the case, and are looking forward to having these legal proceedings draw to a final close in the near future".

At the sentencing hearing on August 1, Castro was sentenced to consecutive life terms in prison, plus 1,000 years, all without any possibility of parole. He was also fined $100,000. The court forfeited all of his property and assets to the Cuyahoga County government. Before his sentencing, Castro addressed the court for nearly twenty minutes, in which he said he was "a good person" and "not a monster", but that he was addicted to sex and pornography and had "practiced the art of masturbation" from a young age. He claimed that he had never beaten or tortured the women, and insisted that "most" of the sex he had with them "was consensual". He shifted between apologizing and blaming the FBI for failing to catch him, as well as blaming his victims themselves for getting in a car with a stranger, along with insisting to the court that when he had sex with them he discovered they were not virgins. He would alternately shift back into apologetic comments, saying: "I hope they can find in their hearts to forgive me because we had a lot of harmony going on in that home".

The sentencing judge also heard from Knight and family members of Berry and DeJesus. Knight told Castro: "You took eleven years of my life away. I spent eleven years in hell; now your hell is just beginning. I will overcome all that has happened, but you will face hell for eternity. I will live on, you will die a little every day as you think of the eleven years of atrocities that you inflicted on us ... I can forgive you, but I will never forget."

Aftermath

Survivors
Knight, Berry, and DeJesus released a video statement on July 9, 2013, thanking the public for their support. An attorney for Berry and DeJesus said that the women "still have a strong desire for privacy" and did not wish to speak to the media about their ordeal. The Cleveland Courage Fund is a bank account set up to help the women in their transition to independent life which had collected approximately $1.05 million at the time of the video's release. Before Berry's disappearance, her grandfather had promised to give her a classic Chevrolet Monte Carlo, built in the year when she was born. He kept the car after her kidnapping in case she was still found alive. He still had it for her when she was released, although it was in need of restoration from having been unused. Several automotive shops offered to perform the restoration for free.

Knight discussed some of her ordeals in an interview with People magazine one year after her release, as well as her life leading up to her abduction. Since her rescue, she legally changed her name and began to get several tattoos as her way of coping with the healing process. She also revealed that her son was adopted by his foster parents while she was in captivity and that she wanted to see him, but she does not want to bring him into the ordeal which she has had to deal with, and planned to see him after he becomes an adult. She planned to open a restaurant and dreamed of getting married, which she did in 2016, and hopes to adopt children, as her years of abuse and torture have made it unlikely for her to ever be able to give birth again. She also planned to reunite with Berry and DeJesus in the future, but began focusing on getting her own life back on track.

Berry and DeJesus received honorary diplomas from John Marshall High School in 2015.
In an interview with WKYC, DeJesus says that she is currently volunteering for the Amber Alert committee, offering comfort to families of abducted children. She remains in touch with Berry and her family. In February 2017, Berry joined the staff of Fox affiliate WJW in Cleveland, where she hosts short recurring segments in which she reports missing person cases in order to help families reunite with missing family members. In April 2019, Berry reunited with Charles Ramsey, six years since her rescue, at an interview that was broadcast on WJW.

House demolition

As part of the plea bargain, the house where Castro had lived and held the women captive was demolished on August 7, 2013. Knight was present and handed out yellow balloons to spectators, which she said represented missing children. The balloons were released before DeJesus' aunt began the demolition with a swing of a crane. The house has been completely blurred out on the street view of Google Maps.

Castro's death 
Castro was found hanging from a bed sheet in his detention cell at the Correctional Reception Center in Orient, Ohio, on the evening of September 3, 2013, one month into his life sentence. He was 53 at the time of his death. Prison staff performed CPR on him before he was taken to the Ohio State University Wexner Medical Center in Columbus, where he was pronounced dead shortly after. The following day, Franklin County coroner Jan Gorniak announced that a preliminary autopsy had found the cause of Castro's death to be suicide by hanging. He was later cremated.

On October 10, 2013, the Ohio Department of Rehabilitation and Correction released a report which suggested that Castro may have died accidentally from auto-erotic asphyxiation rather than suicide. Gorniak rejected the possibility, standing by her ruling of suicide. The report also said that two prison guards had falsified logs documenting their observation of Castro hours before he was found dead. He was not on suicide watch at the time of his death but had been subjected to routine checks every thirty minutes due to his notoriety.

A consultant's report was released on December 3, and officially concluded that "all available evidence pointed to suicide, including a shrine-like arrangement of family pictures and a Bible in Castro's cell, an increasing tone of frustration in his prison journal and the reality of spending the rest of his life in prison while subject to constant harassment." The Ohio State Highway Patrol also reviewed the case and reached the same conclusion.

Media depictions

Books

Films

The Cleveland Kidnappings (documentary). Discovery+. 2021.

See also

 Gary Heidnik
 Fritzl case
 Kidnapping of Colleen Stan
 Kidnapping of Jaycee Dugard
 Michael J. Devlin
 Tanya Nicole Kach
 Natascha Kampusch
 Elizabeth Smart
 Steven Stayner
 List of child abuse cases featuring long-term detention
 List of people who died by suicide by hanging

References

2000s missing person cases
2002 crimes in the United States
2002 in Ohio
2003 crimes in the United States
2003 in Ohio
2004 crimes in the United States
2004 in Ohio
2013 in Ohio
21st century in Cleveland
August 2002 events in the United States
April 2003 events in the United States
April 2004 events in the United States
May 2013 events in the United States
Crimes in Cleveland
Formerly missing people
Kidnapped American children
Kidnappings in the United States
Missing person cases in Ohio
Torture in the United States
People from Cleveland
People from Yauco, Puerto Rico
Rape in the United States
Violence against women in the United States
History of women in Ohio
Incidents of violence against girls
Incidents of violence against women